is a Japanese voice actor and singer affiliated with I'm Enterprise. His notable roles include Ayato Kamina in RahXephon, Akihisa Yoshii in Baka and Test, Haruka Kasugano in Yosuga no Sora, Keima Katsuragi in The World God Only Knows, Syo Kurusu in Uta no Prince-sama series, Nai in Karneval, Hanzō Urushihara in The Devil Is a Part-Timer!, Connie Springer in Attack on Titan, Norifumi Kawakami in Ace of Diamond, Dabi in My Hero Academia, Rex in Xenoblade Chronicles 2, Zenitsu Agatsuma in Demon Slayer: Kimetsu no Yaiba, Nacht Faust in Black Clover, Ryunosuke Naruhodo in The Great Ace Attorney: Adventures, Rindou Haitani in Tokyo Revengers, and adult Kozuki Momonosuke in One Piece and Kokichi Oma in Danganronpa V3

Personal life

On July 2, 2021, it was announced that Shimono had tested positive for COVID-19 and was undergoing treatment. On July 12, 2021, it was announced Shimono has recovered and would return to resume activities.

In an interview in September 2021, Shimono revealed that he had been married for over 10 years, as well as the birth of his second child, which occurred during summer of that same year.

Filmography

TV anime
2002
RahXephon – Ayato Kamina

2003
Bobobo-bo Bo-bobo – Shibito
Kaleido Star – Ken Robbins
Gunparade March – Daisuke Akane

2004
Melody of Oblivion – Eran Vitāru
Sgt. Frog – Masayoshi Yoshiokadaira
Uta-Kata – Rin

2005
Cluster Edge – Agate Fluorite
Fushigi Boshi no Futago Hime – Bānā, Aurā
Hell Girl – Yuji Numata
Solty Rei – Yūto K. Steel

2006
D.Gray-Man – Shifu

2007
Ef: A Tale of Memories. – Hiro Hirono
Ghost Hunt – Tomoaki Sakauchi
Nagasarete Airantō – Ikuto Tōhōin
Ōkiku Furikabutte – Yūichirō Tajima
Sketchbook ~full color's~ – Daichi Negishi
Tokyo Majin Gakuen Kenpuchō: Tō – Tatsuma Hiyuu

2008
Ef: A Tale of Melodies. – Hiro Hirono
Inazuma Eleven – Shinichi Handa, Fideo Ardena
Kannagi – Jin Mikuriya
Soul Eater – Hiro, Masamune Nakatsukasa (young)
Special A – Tadashi Karino

2009
Asura Cryin' – Takuma Higuchi
Basquash! – Dan JD

2010
Baka to Test to Shōkanjū – Akihisa Yoshii
Detective Conan – Moriwaki Minoru (Ep.566)
Mitsudomoe – Satoshi Yabe
Fairy Tail – Sho
Mobile Suit Gundam Unicorn – Takuya Irei
Nurarihyon no Mago – Kuromaru
SD Gundam Sangokuden Brave Battle Warriors – Rikuson Zetaplus
Tantei Opera Milky Holmes – Rat
The World God Only Knows – Keima Katsuragi
Yosuga no Sora – Haruka Kasugano
Kotoura-san – Daichi Muroto

2011
Appleseed XIII – Yoshitsune
Baka to Test to Shōkanjū: Ni! – Akihisa Yoshii
Ben-To – Yō Satō
Dragon Crisis! – Ryuuji Kisaragi
Oretachi ni Tsubasa wa Nai – Takashi Haneda
30-sai no Hoken Taiiku – Hayao Imagawa
Sket Dance – Sasuke Tsubaki
The World God Only Knows II – Keima Katsuragi
Uta no Prince-sama Maji Love 1000% (Season 1) – Syo Kurusu

2012
Aoi Sekai no Chūshin de – Tejirof
Binbō-gami ga! – Momoo Inugami
So, I Can't Play H! – Ryōsuke Kaga
Danball Senki– Hiro Oozora
Kuroko's Basketball – Yūsuke Tanimura
Sket Dance – Sasuke Tsubaki
 Tamako Market – Mechya Mochimazzi

2013
Attack on Titan – Connie Springer
GJ Club – Kyōya Shinomiya
Karneval – Nai
Kotoura-san – Daichi Muroto
Log Horizon – Sojiro Seta
Senyu. – Alba
The Devil Is a Part-Timer! – Hanzō Urushihara/Lucifer
The World God Only Knows: Goddesses Arc, Keima Katsuragi
Uta no Prince-sama Maji Love 2000% (Season 2), Syo Kurusu 
Unbreakable Machine-Doll – Raishin Akabane
Tokyo Ravens – Tenma Momoe

2014
Akatsuki no Yona – Zeno
Baby Steps – Yukichi Fukasawa
Battle Spirits: Saikyou Ginga Ultimate Zero – Miroku
Crayon Shin Chan – Rui
Diamond no Ace – Kawakami Norifumi
Donten ni Warau – Rakuchō Takeda
Gakumon! School of Monsters – Juzu
Mysterious Joker – Spade
Magimoji Rurumo – Nishino
Nobunaga the Fool – Brutus
Noragami – Shimeji 
The Pilot's Love Song – Noriaki Kashiwabara
Tonari no Seki-kun – Toshinari Seki
Wake Up, Girls! – Kuniyoshi Ōta
Z/X Ignition – Asuka Tennōji

2015
Ame-iro Cocoa – Aoi Tokura
Attack on Titan: Junior High – Connie Springer
Baby Steps Season 2 – Yukichi Fukasawa
Durarara!!×2 – Aoba Kuronuma
Etotama – Takeru Amato
Jitsu wa Watashi wa – Yūta Shimada
Junjou Romantica season 3 – Shiiba Mizuki
K: Return of Kings – Kotosaka, Ryuho Camo
Kamisama Kiss 2 – Yatori
Tokyo Ghoul √A – Naki
Uta no Prince-sama Maji Love Revolutions (Season 3) – Syo Kurusu

2016
Berserk – Isidro
Days – Jiro Haibara
Joker Game – Miyoshi
Kamiwaza Wanda – Masato Kurosaki
Myriad Colors Phantom World – Haruhiko Ichijō
Norn9 – Senri Ichinose
Prince of Stride: Alternative – Ayumu Kadowaki
Servamp – Misono Arisuin
Scared Rider Xechs – Hiro Kurama
Mobile Suit Gundam Unicorn RE:0096 – Takuya Irei
Uta no Prince-sama Maji LOVE Legend Star (Season 4) – Syo Kurusu
WWW.Working!! – Takuya Kōno
Twin Star Exorcists – Tenma Unomiya

2017
Attack on Titan Season 2 – Connie Springer
Berserk (Season 2) – Isidro
ACCA: 13-Territory Inspection Dept. – Jean Otus
Yowamushi Pedal: New Generation – Issa Kaburagi
Sakura Quest – Takashi Yamada
Tsurezure Children – Takao Yamane
Kaito x Answer –  Q Buster Head
Dive!! – Chikuwa, Takada
Restaurant to Another World – Sirius Alfade
My Hero Academia 2 – Dabi
Wake Up, Girls! Shin Shou – Kuniyoshi Ōta
Altair: A Record of Battles – Erbach

2018
Attack on Titan Season 3 – Connie Springer
Tada Never Falls in Love - Gentarō Yamashita
Junji Ito Collection – Tōru Oshikiri, Kōta Kawai, Sugio
Yowamushi Pedal: Glory Line – Issa Kaburagi
Pop Team Epic — Popuko (episode 6-B)
Devils' Line — Shōta Akimura
My Hero Academia 3 — Dabi
Nil Admirari no Tenbin: Teito Genwaku Kitan — Narration, Shinnosuk
Tokyo Ghoul:re — Naki
Dances with the Dragons — Īgī Dorie
Record of Grancrest War — Selge Constance
Gurazeni — Haruhiko 
100 Sleeping Princes and the Kingdom of Dreams - Schnee
Boarding School Juliet – Eigo Kohitsuji
Dakaichi – Tomo-kun

2019
The Morose Mononokean II — Shihou
My Roommate Is a Cat — Atsushi Kawase
Demon Slayer: Kimetsu no Yaiba — Zenitsu Agatsuma
My Hero Academia 4 - Dabi, Wash
Hensuki — Keiki Kiryū
Isekai Cheat Magician — Kasim
High School Prodigies Have It Easy Even In Another World — Elch
African Office Worker — Ōhashi (Toucan)
Special 7: Special Crime Investigation Unit — Seiji "Rookie" Nanatsuki
Phantasy Star Online 2: Episode Oracle — Afin

2020
The 8th Son? Are You Kidding Me? — Erwin von Alnim
 Dorohedoro — Insect Sorceror
Dragon Quest: The Adventure of Dai — Deroline
Listeners — Hole
Peter Grill and the Philosopher's Time — Peter Grill
Talentless Nana — Nanao Nakajima
Sleepy Princess in the Demon Castle — The Hero Akatsuki
Attack on Titan Final Season – Connie Springer

2021
Attack on Titan Final Season – Connie Springer
Kemono Jihen – Nobimaru
Log Horizon: Destruction of the Round Table – Sojiro Seta
I-Chu: Halfway Through the Idol – Eva Armstrong
Black Clover – Nacht Faust
My Hero Academia 5 – Dabi, Wash
Backflip!! – Nagayoshi Onagawa
Zombieland Saga Revenge – Committee Member (Episode 7)
The Dungeon of Black Company – Wanibe
Miss Kobayashi's Dragon Maid S – Taketo Aida
Tokyo Revengers - Rindou Haitani
The Fruit of Evolution – Seiichi Hiiragi
Deep Insanity: The Lost Child – Shigure Daniel Kai/Dan Sohn Key
Demon Slayer: Kimetsu no Yaiba – Entertainment District Arc – Zenitsu Agatsuma

2022
Love of Kill – Son Ryang-ha
Orient – Shirō Inukai
Doraemon – Moteo Mote
Pokémon Ultimate Journeys: The Series – Piers
Shikimori's Not Just a Cutie – Fuji Shikimori
RWBY: Ice Queendom – Jaune Arc
My Stepmom's Daughter Is My Ex – Mizuto Irido
The Devil Is a Part-Timer!! – Hanzō Urushihara/Lucifer
Peter Grill and the Philosopher's Time: Super Extra – Peter Grill
My Hero Academia 6 — Dabi, Wash

2023
By the Grace of the Gods Season 2 – Tony
One Piece – Kozuki Momonosuke (adult)
The Fruit of Evolution 2 – Seiichi Hiiragi
Demon Slayer: Kimetsu no Yaiba – Swordsmith Village Arc – Zenitsu Agatsuma
The Marginal Service – Cyrus N. Kuga
My Happy Marriage – Yoshito Godō
New Saga – Seran
Level 1 Demon Lord and One Room Hero – Leo

Original net animation (ONA)
Sword Gai (2018) - Marcus Lithos
JoJo's Bizarre Adventure: Stone Ocean (2022) – Guccio
Romantic Killer (2022) – Manato
Junji Ito Maniac: Japanese Tales of the Macabre (2023) – Oshikiri

Original video animation (OVA)

Baka to Test to Shōkanjū: Matsuri – Akihisa Yoshii
Corpse Party: Missing Footage – Satoshi Mochida
Corpse Party: Tortured Souls – Satoshi Mochida
Cyborg 009 Vs. Devilman – Cyborg 0018/Seth
GJ Club@ – Kyōya Shinomiya
Isekai no Seikishi Monogatari – Kenshi Masaki
Love Pistols – Tsuburaya Norio
Megane na Kanojo – Tatsuya Takatsuka
Memories Off 3.5: Omoide no Kanata he – Shōgo Kaga
Noragami – Shimeji
Saint Seiya: The Lost Canvas – Alone/Hades
Soul Worker: Your Destiny Awaits – Erwin Arclight
Tsubasa Tokyo Revelations – Subaru
The World God Only Knows – Keima Katsuragi
Yona of the Dawn – Zeno

Theatrical animation
RahXephon: Pluralitas Concentio (2003) – Ayato Kamina
Cencoroll (2009) – Tetsu
Inazuma Eleven: Saikyō Gundan Ōga Shūrai (2010) – Shinichi Handa
Inazuma Eleven GO vs. Danbōru Senki W (2012) – Hiro Ōzora
K: Missing Kings (2014) – Kotosaka
Tantei Opera Milky Holmes: Gyakushū no Milky Holmes (2015) – Rat
Yowamushi Pedal Re:Generation  (2017) – Issa Kaburagi
Servamp -Alice in the Garden- (2018) – Misono Alicein
Uta no Prince-sama Maji LOVE Kingdom (2019) – Syo Kurusu
Cencoroll Connect (2019) – Tetsu
My Hero Academia: Heroes Rising (2019) – Dabi
Demon Slayer: Kimetsu no Yaiba the Movie: Infinity Train (2020) – Zenitsu Agatsuma
Mortal Kombat Legends: Scorpion's Revenge (2020) – Liu Kang (Japanese dub)
Fortune Favors Lady Nikuko (2021) – Lizard, Gecko
Backflip!! (2022) – Nagayoshi Onagawa
Uta no Prince-sama: Maji Love ST☆RISH Tours (2022) – Syo Kurusu
Attack on Titan (ongoing) - Connie Springer

Video games

13 Sentinels: Aegis Rim - Juro Kurabe
7th Dragon 2020 - Unit 13
Alchemy Stars – Jomu and Brock
Another Eden – Serge
Aquakids – Rei
Arena of Valor – Slimz (Japanese Server), Zenitsu Agatsuma (Demon Slayer Collab)
Aria The Natural: Tooi Yume no Mirage – Protagonist
Atelier Lilie: Salburg's Alchemist 3 – Theo Mohnmeier
Beast Master & Prince – Lucia
Black Wolves Saga: Bloody Nightmare – Richie
Black Wolves Saga: Last Hope – Richie
Buried Stars, Hyesung Seo
Corpse Party: Blood Covered Repeated Fear – Satoshi Mochida
Corpse Party: Blood Drive – Satoshi Mochida
Corpse Party: Book of Shadows – Satoshi Mochida
Chaos Rings – Zhamo
Cherry Blossom – Satsuki Ouse
D→A: White – Tōya Shinjō
Danganronpa V3: Killing Harmony – Kokichi Oma
Disgaea 2: Cursed Memories – Taro, Prism Red
Disgaea 3 – Almaz fon Almadine Adamant
Dissidia Final Fantasy Opera Omnia – Ceodore
Engage Wars – James Katsumoto
Eternal Sonata – Allegretto
Eureka Seven: TR1: New Wave – Sumner Sturgeon
Final Fantasy XIII – Orphan
Fire Emblem Engage - Alear
Food Fantasy - Pizza
Gloria Union – Ishut, Ashley
God Eater Resonant Ops – Male Protagonist (Leo Kamiki)
Grand Chase: Dimensional Chaser – Ryan
Hana Yori Dango: Koi Seyo Otome! – Kazuya Aoike
Hi-Fi Rush – Chai
Home Sweet Home – Tim
Hyakka Hyakurō: Sengoku Ninpōchō – Kuroyuki
Icey – Narrator
I-Chu – Eva Armstrong
Ikemen Revolution: Alice and Love Magic – Ray Blackwell
Issho ni Gohan – Yosuke Toriyama
Jojo's Bizarre Adventure: All Star Battle – Secco
Last Escort 2 - Reiji
League of Legends = Yone
Moujuutsukai to Oujisama – Lucia
NORN9 – Ichinose Senri
Phantasy Star Online 2 – Afin, Ohza
Phantom Brave – Ash
Project X Zone – Zephyr
Project X Zone 2 - Zephyr
RahXephon: Sōkyū Gensōkyoku – Ayato Kamina
Resonance of Fate – Zephyr
Rune Factory 4 – Kiel
Seishun Hajimemashita! – Kaoru Kasugame
Shadow Hearts 2 – Kurando Inugami
Shikigami no Shiro: Nanayozuki Gensōkyoku – Rei Kanan
Shin Megami Tensei IV: Apocalypse – Protagonist
Shinobi, Koi Utsutsu - Garaiya
Shōjo Yoshitsuneden – Benkei Musashibō
Soul Worker: Your Destiny Awaits – Erwin Arclight
Star Ocean 5: Integrity and Faithlessness – Ted
Super Robot Wars MX – Ayato Kamina
Super Heroine Chronicle – Claude
Super Smash Bros. Ultimate - Rex
Tales of Symphonia: Dawn of the New World – Emil Castagnier
Tales of the World: Radiant Mythology 3 – Emil Castagnier
Tartaros – Soma
Teikoku Sensenki, Shu Hishin
The Great Ace Attorney: Adventures – Ryunosuke Naruhodo
The Great Ace Attorney 2: Resolve – Ryunosuke Naruhodo
The Last Story, Yuris
The Thousand Musketeers - Kirch
Touken Ranbu - Hakusan Yoshimitsu
Tower of Fantasy - Male Protagonist
Uta no Prince-sama – Syo Kurusu
Uta no Prince-sama Repeat, Syo Kurusu
Uta no Prince-sama Sweet Serenade, Syo Kurusu
Uta no Prince-sama Amazing Aria, Syo Kurusu
Uta no Prince-sama All Star, Syo Kurusu
Uta no Prince-sama All Star After Secret, Syo Kurusu
Valkryie Connect, Trickster God Loki
Warriors Orochi 4, Perseus (Loki)
Wild Arms 5, Dean Stark
Xenoblade Chronicles 2, Rex
Ys IX: Monstrum Nox — Jules, Renegade
Zack & Wiki: Quest for Barbaros' Treasure, Zack

Radio

Voice Crew, Kaori Mizuhashi's 12th Century personality
 Radio Misty with Yūki Kaji
 Kimetsu Radio with Natsuki Hanae
 Attack on Titan Radio

CD drama

-8 (Minus Eight) – Tonami Otohiko
Ai no Fukasa wa Hizakurai – Subaru Sakashita
Alice=Alice – King
Alice's Adventures in Wonderland – The Hatter
Beauty Pop – Kei Minami
Bokura no Unsei: Seifuku to Anata – Sugiura
Brother Shuffle! – as Mafuyu Sakurai
Chrome Shelled Regios – Layfon Wolfstein Alseif
Corpse Party – Satoshi Mochida
Egoist Prince – Rolf's help boy
Eien no Shichigatsu – Ryuusuke Saitou
Heart Supplement Series – (Sunday) Hinata
Like a Butterfly – Ryōsuke Takaya
Honoka na Koi no Danpen o – Toranosuke
Honto Yajuu – Yamase
Junk!Boys – Ayame Suhara
Karneval – Nai
Kindan Vampire 2 – Mateus von Weiseheldenburg
Kotoba Nante Iranai – Takumi Sahara
Kyoudai no Jijou – Juri Mizuhashi
Love Neko – Mimio
Maid-sama – Shouichiro Yukimura
Mo Dao Zu Shi/Ma Dou So Shi – Lan Jingyi/Ran Keigi 
Norn9 – Senri
Oz to Himitsu no Ai – The third key: Keisa
Saint Seiya Episode.G – Leo Aiolia
Shimekiri no Sono Mae ni!? – Tomohisa Tsutsugi
Shinsengumi Mokuhiroku Wasurenagusa Vol.4 – Toudou Heisuke
Soubou Sangokushi – Riku Son (Lu Xun)
Storm Lover 2nd – Isuzu Kazuhisa
Teikoku Sensenki – Shu Hishin
Toriai Kyoudai – Gyoto Ashikawa
Tsuki ni Ookami – Tsukishiro
Ubu Kare – Taiki
Wagamama dakedo Itoshikute – Shūji Adachi
Yatamomo – Momo
Yosei Gakuen Feararuka - Futago no Sylph ni Goyojin- – Tooru
Secret XXX – Shouhei Ikushima

Live-action films
 Chronos Jaunter no Densetsu (2019), Kazuhiko Suihara
 Ghost Book (2022), Ittan-momen (voice)

Vomics

 Hetakoi – Shizuka Komai
 Shitsuren Chocolatier – Sōta Koyurugi

Dubbing

Live-action
Alex Rider – Tom Harris (Brenock O'Connor)
Bones – Clinton Gilmore
Chloe – Michael Stewart
The Contract – Chris Keene
CSI: Crime Scene Investigation episode "Field Mice" – Guillermo Seidel
The Dust Factory – Ryan Flynn (Ryan Kelley)
F9 – Earl (Jason Tobin)
Famous in Love – Jake Salt
Game Shakers – Hudson Gimble
Goodbye Christopher Robin – Older Christopher Robin Milne (Alex Lawther)
Hannah Montana episode "My Best Friend's Boyfriend" – Lucas
High Strung – Johnnie Blackwell (Nicholas Galitzine)
Mortal Engines – Bevis Pod (Ronan Raftery)
Real – Jang Tae-yeong (Kim Soo-hyun)

Animation
Exchange Student Zero – Hiro

Discography

Singles

References

External links
 
Official agency profile 

1980 births
Living people
I'm Enterprise voice actors
Japanese male pop singers
Japanese male video game actors
Japanese male voice actors
Male voice actors from Tokyo
Pony Canyon artists
21st-century Japanese male actors
21st-century Japanese singers
21st-century Japanese male singers